The Drag-Net is a 1936 American crime film directed by Vin Moore and starring Rod La Rocque, Marian Nixon and Betty Compson. It was made as a second feature at the Talisman Studios in Hollywood.

Synopsis
A young playboy attorney is fired from his father's firm due to his lifestyle. He instead takes a job with the district attorney's office taking on a major crime gang.

Cast
 Rod La Rocque as Lawrence Thomas Jr.
 Marian Nixon as Katherine 'Kit' van Buren
 Betty Compson as Mollie Cole
 Jack Adair as Joseph 'Joe' Ross
 John Dilson as Arnold Crane
 Edward Keane as Asst. District Attorney Arthur Hill
 Donald Kerr as Al Wilson
 Joseph W. Girard as Thomas J. Harrison, District Attorney
 John Bantry as Fred Cole
 Edward LeSaint as Lawrence Thomas Sr. 
 Allen Mathews as Louie Miller
 Sidney Payne as Spike - the Headwaiter
 Gertrude Messinger as Switchboard Operator 
 Murdock MacQuarrie as Hot-Check Gambler
 Jack Cheatham as Cop

References

Bibliography
 Pitts, Michael R. Poverty Row Studios, 1929-1940. McFarland & Company, 2005.

External links
 

1936 films
1936 crime films
American crime films
Films directed by Vin Moore
1930s English-language films
1930s American films